Ukraine sent a delegation of athletes to the 2000 Summer Paralympics.

Medal table

See also
Ukraine at the Paralympics
Ukraine at the 2000 Summer Olympics

References

External links
Sydney 2000, International Paralympic Committee

Nations at the 2000 Summer Paralympics
2000
Paralympics